Ban Khwao is a district (amphoe) of Chaiyaphum province, northeastern Thailand.  It is a region known for its quality Thai silk.

History
In 1806, people from Ban Khao in Nakhon Ratchasima province migrated to the area of modern-day Ban Khwao District.  When their new settlement proved to be successful, they sent the 'good news' to their relatives in the old village. The new community flourished, and the people agreed to name the new village Ban Khwao (lit. 'village of good news') to commemorate its history.

The area was made a minor district on 1 January 1955, when the two subdistricts Ban Khwao and Talat Raeng were split off from Mueang Chaiyaphum District. It was upgraded to a full district on 23 July 1957.

Geography
Neighboring districts are (from the north clockwise): Nong Bua Daeng, Mueang Chaiyaphum, Noen Sa-nga, Chatturat and Nong Bua Rawe.

Administration
The district is divided into six subdistricts (tambons), which are further subdivided into 94 villages (mubans). The township (thesaban tambon) Ban Khwao covers four villages of tambon Ban Khwao.

References

External links
amphoe.com (Thai)

Ban Khwao